The EMU800 is a series of electric multiple unit train used by the Taiwan Railways Administration (TRA).

Introduction

The EMU800 series was purchased in response to increasing passenger volume and electrification of branch lines, which diverted older commuter EMUs. At 296 cars, the order is the second-largest ever placed by TRA. The first two EMU800 trains were built by Nippon Sharyo, and the remaining 35 were built by the Taiwan Rolling Stock Company from 2013 to 2015. At the beginning there was a dispute over the braking system. After years of negotiation, TRA accepted the proposal and the EMU800 began to service.

Features
Unlike previous commuter EMUs, the EMU800  features a fully streamlined nose. Its yellow-and-blue paint scheme has earned it the nickname "smiling train" (微笑號) due to the way the stripe is painted on.

The EMU800 is also the first to have bicycle racks, installed in each of the end cars. Another feature new to the 800 is displays inside the cabin to broadcast messages. The EMU800 is meant to displace older locomotive-hauled trains and the older EMU500 on main line services.

In 2016, the TRA purchased six additional trains. The colors on these trains are inverted, earning the nickname "minion train" (小小兵號).

Service
EMU800s were introduced into service starting from January 2, 2014.  Most trainsets are based out of either Hsinchu or Chiayi on services in the greater Taipei and Kaoshiung areas.

References

Electric multiple units of Taiwan
Passenger rail transportation in Taiwan
Train-related introductions in 2014
25 kV AC multiple units
Nippon Sharyo multiple units